Škoda Transportation a.s. is a Czech engineering company that continues the legacy of Škoda Works' rolling stock manufacturing that started at the end of 19th century in Plzeň. Following the first world war, the Works commenced locomotive production in a separate factory dedicated to that purpose. This factory became a separate company in the 1990s. Today, Škoda Transportation develops and manufactures electric rail vehicles for urban and railway transport.

Škoda Transportation fully or partially owns a number of other companies active in the field of development and manufacturing of rolling stock, electric motors and related products in several European countries. In April 2018, the European Commission cleared purchase of the group by PPF, a financial and investment group incorporated in the Netherlands.

Škoda Transportation group of companies is among the world's largest manufacturers of trams and propulsion units for trolleybuses and a significant regional producer of railway vehicles.

History

Škoda Works
Count Waldstein established a metallurgical factory in Plzeň in 1859. Starting with 100 employees, the factory was making products for breweries, sugar mills, mines, as well as steam engines and railway products. The factory was bought by its chief engineer Emil Škoda in 1869. By the end of the century, Škoda Works became one of the largest enterprises in Europe, focusing mainly on the production of heavy arms and heavy ship components.

Apart from military production, the Works were also producing a number of rolling stock components by the end of the 19th century: wheels, axles, hoops and steam engines. During the first world war the company started refurbishing locomotives. By 1918, the company had 35.000 employees and a debilitating debt accrued due to unpaid military deliveries to the Central Powers as well as unpaid pre-war loan that the company provided to China.

Locomotive factory
As a part of its shift towards non-military production, the Works earmarked a portion of its facilities for manufacturing of locomotives. The production started following an order for 30 locomotives for Czechoslovakia. The first Škoda locomotive left the factory on 11 June 1920. Meanwhile, Škoda gained a major contract for production of 80 and refurbishment of 500 locomotives for Romania. Due to the Romanian order Škoda regained banks' confidence which provided the company with financing to survive through the immediate post-war years. The locomotive factory became one of the company's main pillars.

The company produced its 100th locomotive on 13 September 1921. In 1927 Škoda produced its first express electric locomotive which was followed by the introduction of electric freight locomotives. While electric locomotives were used on electrified lines within Prague, the company further produced electric locomotives with batteries for use within factory areas. Also in 1927, Škoda started production of diesel locomotives and diesel express trains. In the 1930s, the locomotive factory was producing on average 3 locomotives a month with third of the production for export.

Meanwhile in another factory building situated in Plzeň, Škoda started producing electrical propulsion units for trams in the early 1920s. In 1936 the company started producing the model 3Tr,  6Tr, 7Tr, 8Tr, 9Tr trolleybuses.

Production of locomotives as well as trolleybuses continued during the company's period of nationalization after the WW2. After fall of communism in 1989, Škoda Works were transformed into a joint stock company, the assets of which were later diversified into several separate entities, among them also Škoda Dopravní Technika s. r. o. which included the rolling stock factory in Plzeň and which was renamed to Škoda Transportation in 2004.

In the early 1990s, the company started working also on refurbishment of trams, which was followed by introduction of its first own tram design in 1997, the low-floor Škoda 03 T.

Škoda Transportation
The Czech Republic sold Škoda Transportation to private owners in 2002. While in private hands, the company extended its reach by purchasing stock in other companies that are active in production and R&D of rolling stock in Europe. Today, Škoda Transportation group of companies is one of the world's largest manufacturers of trams and propulsion units for trolleybuses as well as a significant regional producer of locomotives and electric trains.

Daughter and affiliate companies 

Škoda Transportation  a.s. daughter and affiliated companies 

The group of companies employed close to 5,600 people in 2015, with revenues reaching CZK 17 billion.

Products

Techmania Science Center 
Škoda Transportation and the University of West Bohemia run Techmania Science Center in Plzeň. The exhibition is annually visited by tens of thousands of schoolchildren and students who learn about various principles of mathematics and physics in an engaging way. The science center also includes a number of historical Škoda rolling stock products.

References

External links 
 

Transportation
Bus manufacturers of the Czech Republic
Locomotive manufacturers of the Czech Republic
Electric vehicle manufacturers of the Czech Republic
Tram manufacturers
Trolleybus manufacturers
Czech brands
Companies established in 1995
PPF Group